(GALEX) was a Japanese company which intended to develop the GX rocket. 
GALEX was established on 27 March 2001. The Japanese government finally abandoned the GX program in December 2009.
GALEX disbanded around March 2010.

Shareholders 
As of November 2009, the shareholders of the company were:
 IHI Corporation (IHI)
 IHI Aerospace Co., Ltd. (IA)
 Mitsubishi Corporation (MC)
 Kawasaki Heavy Industries, Ltd. (KHI)
 Japan Aviation Electronics Industry, Limited (JAE)
 Fuji Heavy Industries Ltd. (FHI)
 Kokusai AeroMarine Co., Ltd. (KAM)
 NEC Corporation (NEC)
 Lockheed Martin Overseas Corporation (LMOC)

References 
 

Manufacturing companies based in Tokyo
Defunct companies of Japan
Defunct spaceflight companies
IHI Corporation
Aerospace companies of Japan